Senjetak may refer to:
 Senjetak, Afghanistan
 Senjetak, Bajestan, in Razavi Khorasan Province, Iran
 Senjetak, Gonabad, in Razavi Khorasan Province, Iran

See also
 Senjedak (disambiguation)